Kylie Price (born 1993) is a New Zealand singer-songwriter.

Early life
Price spent her childhood in Dunedin and was educated at Kavanagh College.

Career
In 2011, Kylie Price won Good Morning's "Find A Star" competition.

In 2012, she entered New Zealand's Got Talent but refused to sign their contracts leading to her exit from the show. Later that year she won several awards at the Australasian country music awards.

Awards and nominations

|-
| style="text-align:center;" rowspan="5"| 2011
| rowspan="5"|Kylie Price
|  Good Morning's "Find A Star" competition
| 
|-
| Overall Talent Quest Winner
| 
|-
| Overall Senior Quest Winner
| 
|-
| Senior female vocal quest
| 
|-
| Tamworth Songwriter's Association award
| 
|-
|}

References

External links
Official website

Living people
New Zealand women singer-songwriters
People educated at Trinity Catholic College, Dunedin
1994 births
New Zealand women pop singers
21st-century New Zealand women singers